The Harvard Square Centre is a building located at 1344–1346 Broadway Street in Downtown Detroit, within the Broadway Avenue Historic District and next to the Merchants Building. It was built in 1925 and stands at 12 floors in height, designed in the Beaux-Arts architectural style with Romanesque accents. It is currently unused. The current plans for the building calls for a renovation that will include 21 loft apartments. Heritage National Investment has proposed converting the building into 21 residential loft apartments.

External links

 Google Maps location of the Harvard Square Center
 
 

1925 establishments in Michigan
Buildings and structures completed in 1925
Buildings and structures in Detroit
Unused buildings in Detroit